The Ashford Caves, located within the Kwiambal National Park, are a series of caves that contain an outcrop of coralline limestone and are located in the New England Northern Tablelands region of New South Wales, in eastern Australia.

Originally on a private property, the Ashford Caves are now part of the Kwiambal National Park. A basic camping ground called 'Lemon Tree Flat' is located within a  radius of the cave entrance, as are the Macintyre Falls.

The large arch-shaped opening was made to access the phosphate (guano) resources for use as fertilizer, which has been quite profitable. Prospects of mining limestone at this location have been explored, but dismissed as unviable.

A colony of Eastern Bent-wing Bats inhabits the cave system and breeds from November through March.

See also

 List of caves in New South Wales

References

Caves of New South Wales
Limestone caves
Northern Tablelands